State Highway 44 (SH 44) is a State Highway in Kerala, India that starts in Pamba and ends in Neriyamangalam. The highway is 152 km long.

Route map

See also 
Roads in Kerala
List of State Highways in Kerala

References 

State Highways in Kerala
Roads in Pathanamthitta district
Roads in Kottayam district
Roads in Thiruvananthapuram district
Roads in Idukki district